Halley's Comet is a short-period comet visible from Earth every 75–76 years.

Halley's Comet or Haley's Comet may also refer to:
Halley's Comet (video game), a 1986 arcade game
"Haley's Comet", a song by Dave Alvin from the album Blue Blvd (1991)
"Halley's Comet", a song by Billie Eilish from the album Happier Than Ever (2021)

See also
Halley's Comet Opal, gemstone discovered in 1986 when the comet was visible
Bill Haley & His Comets, band named for the comet
Bill Haley and His Comets, their self-titled album